Nordisk Copyright Bureau (n©b) is a copyright collecting society which maintains Nordic and Baltic composers', writers' and producers' copyrights.

NCB is based in Copenhagen, Denmark, and is owned by the collecting societies in the Nordic countries; KODA (DK), STEF (IS), STIM (SE), Teosto (FI) and TONO (NO).

External links
 Nordisk Copyright Bureau website (in English)

Copyright collection societies
Music licensing organizations